Lunas del Auditorio is a recognition given by the Auditorio Nacional to the best live concerts in Mexico. The prize is a replica of the sculpture of the Moon by sculptor Juan Soriano. The ceremony is broadcast by Televisa, TV Azteca, Channel 22 of the Secretariat of Culture and Canal Once of the National Polytechnic Institute of Mexico.

The awards were created in 2002 to celebrate the 50th anniversary of the Auditorio Nacional. It is intended to reward groups, companies and soloists acts in Mexico.

Winners

2002 
 Career as a Composer and Performer: Armando Manzanero
 A Life on Stage: María Victoria
 Artistic Career: Luis Miguel
 Rock in Spanish: El Tri
 Foreign Language Rock: Eric Clapton
 Pop in Spanish: Aleks Syntek
 Foreign Language Pop: Miguel Bosé
 Ballad: Alejandro Sanz
 Jazz & Blues: Diana Krall
 Grupera Music: Celso Piña
 African Rhythms: Buena Vista Social Club
 Mexican Music: Alejandro Fernández
 Latin American Music to the World: Joan Manuel Serrat
 Family Show: Disney on Ice
 Research and Recovery: Óscar Chávez
 Classical Show: Madama Butterfly
 Dance: Mariinsky Ballet (Don Quixote - Swan Lake - Ballet Gala)
 Musical Theater: The Phantom of the Opera
 Revelation: Elefante
 Sponsor: Telmex

2003 
 Artistic Trajectory: Chespirito
 A Life on Stage: Silvia Pinal
 Spanish Rock: Café Tacuba
 Foreign Language Rock: Peter Gabriel
 Spanish Pop: Shakira
 Foreign Language Pop: Paul McCartney
 Ballad: Rosana Arbelo
 Jazz & Blues: Pat Metheny Group
 Grupera Music: Los Tigres del Norte
 African Rhythms: Celia Cruz
 Mexican Music: Vicente Fernández and Alejandro Fernandez
 Ibero-American Music to the World: Tania Libertad
 Family Show: Cirque du Soleil
 Research and Recovery: Ballet Folklorico de Mexico
 Classical Show: Das Rheingold
 Dance: Mariinsky Ballet
 Musical Theater: Les Misérables
 Alternative Show: Marcel Marceau
 Alternative Cultural Promotion: Dfiesta Program in Mexico City, of the Government of the Federal District
 Revelation: Yahir

2004 
 Artistic Trajectory: Ernesto Alonso
 A Life on Stage: Amparo Arozamena
 Musical Composition: Rubén Fuentes
 Spanish Rock: Café Tacuba
 Spanish Pop: Alejandro Sanz
 Foreign Language Rock: Coldplay
 Foreign Language Pop: Air Supply
 Ballad: Sin Bandera
 Jazz and Blues: Lincoln Center Jazz Orchestra with Wynton Marsalis
 Grupera Music: Intocable
 African Rhythms: Ruben Blades
 Mexican Music: Pepe Aguilar
 Family Show: Cirque du Soleil
 Research and Recovery: Ballet Folklorico de Mexico
 Alternative Show: Festival Alternative (Café Tacuba, La Mala Rodriguez, Cerati, Placebo, Kinky)
 Classical Show: National Symphony Orchestra
 Dance: Spanish National Dance Company
 Musical Theater: Les Misérables
 Forger of the Popular Imagination: Manuel Esperón
 Artistic Innovation: Miguel Bosé
 Latin American Music to the World: Joan Manuel Serrat
 Revelation: Angélica Vale

2005 
 Artistic Trajectory: Ignacio López Tarso
 A Life on Stage: Carmen Montejo
 Spanish Rock: Café Tacuba
 Spanish Pop: Diego Torres
 Ballad: Sin Bandera
 African Rhythms: International Sonora Santanera
 Mexican Music: Juan Gabriel
 Classical Show: Carmina Burana Monumental Opera
 Modern Dance: Spanish National Dance Company (Carmina Burana - Dionaea - The Nutcracker - Swan Lake)
 Ballet: Ballet Bolshoi
 Musical Theater: Fiddler on the Roof
 Family Show: Disney on Ice
 Jazz and Blues: Jazz Festival 2005 (Diana Krall, Mike Stern, Chucho Valdes, Wayne Shorter, Maria Rita, Yellowjackets)
 Research and Recovery: La Guelaguetza
 Grupera Music: Intocable
 Latin American Music to the World: Chucho Valdés and Diego el Cigala
 Alternative Show: Stomp
 Foreign Language Rock: Lenny Kravitz
 Foreign Language Pop: Eros Ramazzotti
 Revelation: Moderatto

2006 
 Artistic Career: Jose Angel Espinoza
 A Life on Stage: Manuel "El Loco" Valdés
 Mexican Artist with International Projection: Alejandro Fernandez
 Spanish Rock: Alejandra Guzman
 Foreign Language Rock: U2
 Spanish Pop: Luis Miguel
 Foreign Language Pop: Air Supply
 Ballad: Raphael
 Jazz and Blue: Jazz Chick Corea and Touchstone
 Grupera Music: Intocable
 African Rhythms: Buena Vista Social Club
 Mexican Music: Alejandro Fernandez
 Latin American Music to the World: Diego el Cigala
 Family Show: Cirque du Soleil Saltimbanco
 Alternative Show: Nevermore: A Concert for Life
 Classical Show: Vienna Philharmonic Orchestra Director Riccardo Muti
 Modern Dance: Ballet Theater Space, 2002 Carmen
 Musical Theater: Cabaret
 Ballet: Ballet of the Teatro alla Scala in Milan in June
 Electronic Music: Moby
 Tradition and Folklore: Jarocho
 Revelation: Zoé

2007 
 Artistic Career: Marco Antonio Muñiz
 A Life on Stage: Sergio Corona
 Spanish Rock: Zoé
 Foreign Language Rock: Coldplay
 Spanish Pop: Shakira
 Foreign Language Pop: Robbie Williams
 Ballad: From A to Z (Armando Manzanero and Susana Zabaleta)
 Jazz and Blues: Jazz Festival 2006 Mexico City
 Grupera Music: K-Paz de la Sierra
 African Rhythms: Celsus Pineapple
 Mexican Music: Alejandro Fernández
 Latin American Music to the World: Joaquín Sabina
 Family Show: Slava's Snowshow
 Alternative Show: Festival Vive Latino 2006
 Classical Show: Aida, Opera monumental fire
 Modern Dance: Corner Down! (Spanish National Dance Company)
 Musical Theater: Hoy no me Puedo Levantar
 Ballet: Sleeping Beauty (Spanish National Dance Company)
 Electronic Music: Depeche Mode
 Tradition and Folklore: Jarocho
 Spanish Pop - Revelation: Camila
 Renewed Tradition: Ana Ofelia Murguía

2008 
 Artistic Trajectory: José José
 A Life on Stage: Fannie Kauffman
 Spanish Rock: Café Tacuba
 Foreign Language Pop: Alizée
 Ballad: Emmanuel
 Grupera Music: Banda el Recodo
 Ibero-American Music: Dos Pájaros de un Tiro (Joan Manuel Serrat and Joaquín Sabina)
 Family Show: Quidam (Cirque du Soleil)
 Alternative Show: Fuerza Bruta
 Modern Dance: Ballet Theater Space
 Ballet: Royal Ballet in London in August
 Musical Theater: The Lion King
 Foreign Language Rock: Bob Dylan
 Jazz and Blues: Bobby McFerrin
 Classical Show: Ennio Morricone (Music per il cinema)
 Electronic Music: Daft Punk
 World Music: Manu Chao
 Pop in Spanish: Miguel Bosé
 Mexican Music: Juan Gabriel
 Tradition and Folklore: Chavela Vargas
 African-American Music: Omara Portuondo
 Revelation: Ximena Sariñana

2009 
 Artistic Trajectory: Banda el Recodo
 A Life on Stage: Elsa Aguirre
 Spanish Rock: Café Tacuba
 Foreign Language Rock: Radiohead
 Spanish Pop: Miguel Bosé
 Foreign Language Pop: Madonna
 Ballad: Yuri
 Jazz and Blues: Béla Fleck & the Flecktones
 Grupera Music: Los Tigres del Norte
 African Rhythms: Sonora Santanera
 Mexican Music: Alejandro Fernández
 Latin American Music: Joan Manuel Serrat
 Latin American Music to the World: Isabel Pantoja
 Family Show: Slava's Snowshow
 Research and Recovery: Ema Elena Valdelamar
 Classical Show: Plácido Domingo
 Dance: National Contemporary Dance Company of Cuba (Carmina Burana)
 Musical Theater: The Sound of Music
 World Music: Manu Chao
 Tradition and Folklore: Joaquín Cortés
 Electronic Music: Kinky
 Ballet: Compañía Nacional de Danza y Orquesta del Teatro de Bellas Artes (The Nutcracker)
 Alternative Show: Lila Downs
 Composition for Mexico de Siempre: Emma Elena Valdelamar
 Revelation: Alexander Acha

2010 
 Artistic Career: Yolanda Montes
 A Life on Stage: Xavier López Chabelo
 Foreign Language Rock: Paul McCartney
 Foreign Language Pop: Elton John
 Ballad: Reyli
 Grupera Music: La Arrolladora Banda El Limón
 Classical Show: National Opera Company
 Only the Truth: The True Story of Camelia La Texana
 Modern Dance: National Dance Company of the INBA. Carmina Burana and Esquina Bajan. Tribute to Nellie Happee
 Musical Theater: Lies, the Musical
 Traditional Music: Susana Harp and the IPN Symphony Orchestra. Of revelry and velorios
 Jazz and Blues: Paté de Fuá
 Mexican Music: Pedro Fernández
 Ballet: Ballet of Kiev
 World Music: Lila Downs
 Electronic Music: Kinky
 Ibero-American Music: Diego el Cigala
 Family Show: Circo Atayde
 Alternative Show: Brute Force
 Traditional Dance: Joaquín Cortés
 Rock in Spanish: Enrique Bunbury
 Pop in Spanish: Julieta Venegas
 African-American Music: Ruben Blades
 Revelation: Hello Seahorse!

2011 
 Artistic Career: Joaquín Cordero
 A Life on Stage: Julio Alemán
 Spanish Rock: Zoé
 Foreign Language Rock: U2
 Spanish Pop: Camila
 Foreign Language Pop: The Black Eyed Peas
 Electronic Music: David Guetta
 Jazz and Blues: Let's celebrate America; Jazz at Lincoln Center Orchestra with Wynton Marsalis; Paquito de Rivera; Antonio Sánchez; Diego Urcola and Edmar Castañeda
 Grupera Music: Espinoza Paz
 African-American Music: Calle 13
 Mexican Music: Alejandro Fernández
 Ibero-American Music: Joan Manuel Serrat
 Music Theater: Mamma Mia
 Traditional Music: The Folkloristas 2011
 Ballad: Marco Antonio Solís
 Modern Dance: Pilobolus Dance Theater
 Traditional Dance: La Guelaguetza
 Alternative Show: Philip Glass
 Family Show: Slava's Snowshow
 Classical Show: Alondra de la Parra and Placido Domingo: Mexico celebrates Placido Domingo in concert
 World Music: Emir Kusturika / The No Smoking Orchestra
 Ballet: Spanish National Dance Company
 Revelation: Espinoza Paz

2012 
 Artistic Career: Óscar Chávez
 A Life on Stage: Angélica María
 Ibero-American Artistic Legacy : Joaquín Sabina and Joan Manuel Serrat
 Spanish Rock: Wirikuta Fest
 Foreign Language Rock: Paul McCartney
 Spanish Pop: Gloria Trevi
 Foreign Language Pop: Elton John
 Electronic Music: Nortec Collective Presents: Bostich + Fussible
 Jazz and Blues: Michael Bublé
 Grupera Music: Jenni Rivera
 African-American Music: Buena Vista Social Club, Omara Portuondo
 Mexican Music: Pedro Fernández
 Latin American Music: Chavela Vargas (La Luna Grande - Homage to García Lorca)
 Ballad: Cristian Castro
 Alternative Show: Lila Downs: Pecados y milagros
 Family Show: Cirque du Soleil: Ovo
 Classical Show: André Rieu & His Johann Strauss Orchestra
 Modern Dance: Compañía Tania Pérez-Salas (Pasión por la Danza)
 Theatrical Musical: Mentiras - The Musical
 World Music: Julia Migenes, Teresa Salgueiro, Angélique Kidjo, Mala Rodríguez, Bebel Gilberto, Olivia Gorra and Denise de Kalafe: Women of the World Sing
 Ballet: Spanish National Dance Company (The Nutcracker)
 Traditional Dance: Ballet Folklórico de México of Amalia Hernández
 Traditional Music: Diego el Cigala: Cigala & Tango
 Revelation: Group Torreblanca

2013 
 Artistic Career: Vargas de Tecalitlán
 A Life on Stage: Héctor Bonilla
 Spanish Rock: Caifanes
 Foreign Language Rock: Metallica
 Spanish Pop: Emmanuel & Manuel Mijares
 Foreign Language Pop: Madonna
 Electronic Music: David Guetta
 Jazz and Blues: Paté de Fuá
 Grupera Music: La Arrolladora Banda El Limón
 African-American Music: Cumbre Tajín 2013
 Mexican Music: Alejandro Fernández
 Ibero-American Music: Joan Manuel Serrat and Joaquín Sabina
 Ballad: Franco De Vita
 Alternative Show: Lila Downs
 Family Show: Cirque du Soleil: Michael Jackson The Immortal World Tour
 Classical Show: Ópera de Bellas Artes: Carmen
 Modern Dance: Beijing Dance LDTX
 Musical Theater: Mary Poppins
 World Music: Concha Buika
 Festival: Clazz Continental Latin Jazz
 Ballet: Spanish National Dance Company (The Nutcracker)
 Traditional Dance: Ballet Folklórico de México of Amalia Hernández
 Traditional Music: Los Folkloristas - Viva México! Mi Canto Tiene Raíz (Guillermo Pérez Ávila, Patricio Hidalgo and Leovigildo Martínez Vásquez)
 Emblematic Venue: Hall Los Angeles
 Revelation: Jenny and the Mexicats

2014 
 Artistic Trajectory: Fernando Luján
 A Life on Stage: José Solé
 Spanish Rock: Café Tacuba
 Spanish Rock / Precursors of the Contemporary Mexican Rock: Caifanes
 Foreign Language Rock: Santana
 Spanish Pop: Jesse & Joy
 Foreign Language Pop: Beyoncé
 Electronic Music: Avicii
 Jazz and Blues: Hugh Laurie and Copper Bottom Band
 Grupera Music: La Arrolladora Banda El Limón
 African-American music: Los Ángeles Azules
 Mexican Music: Alejandro Fernández
 Ibero-American Music: Joan Manuel Serrat
 Ballad: Franco de Vita
 Alternative Show: Lila Downs
 Family Show: Disney on Ice, Fun Forever
 Classical Show: Ópera de Bellas Artes: La Boheme
 Modern Dance: Quadrille: Dance Swan
 Musical Theater: Wicked (Danna Paola and Cecilia de la Cueva)
 World Music: Paco de Lucía
 Festival: Festival Internacional Cervantino
 Ballet: Spanish National Dance Company
 Traditional Dance: Guelaguetza 2013
 Traditional Music: Diego el Cigala
 Emblematic Venue: Palace of Fine Arts
 Artistic Revelation: Sofi Mayen

2015 
 Artistic Career: Los Tigres del Norte
 A Life on Stage: Diana Bracho
 Spanish Rock: Café Tacuba
 Spanish Rock / Precursors of the Contemporary Mexican Rock: Jaime Lopez
 Foreign Language Rock: Carlos Santana
 Spanish Pop: Ricky Martin
 Foreign Language Pop: Bruno Mars
 Electronic Music: Paul van Dyk
 Jazz and Blues: Michael Bublé
 Grupera Music: Julión Álvarez
 African-American Music: Los Ángeles Azules
 Mexican Music: Juan Gabriel
 Ibero-American Music: Joaquin Sabina
 Ballad: Camila
 Alternative Show: Lila Downs
 Family Show: Cirque du Soleil
 Classical Show: Symphony Orchestra Mining
 Modern Dance: Mexico City Ballet
 Musical Theater: The Lion King
 World Music: Ten Pianos
 Festival: Latin American Festival Vive Latino
 Ballet: Spanish National Dance Company
 Traditional Dance: Guelaguetza 2014
 Traditional Music: Son de Madera
 Precinct Landmark: Teatro Degollado
 Artistic Revelation: Caloncho

2016 
 Artistic Career: Luz Maria Aguilar
 A Life on Stage: Susana Alexander
 Spanish Pop: Café Tacuba and Zoé
 Spanish Rock / Precursors of the Contemporary Mexican Rock: Cecilia Toussaint
 Foreign Language Rock: The Rolling Stones
 Spanish Pop: OV7 and Kabah
 Foreign Language Pop: Coldplay
 Electronic Music: David Guetta
 Jazz and Blues: Paté de Fuá
 Grupera Music: Julión Álvarez
 African-American Music: Los Ángeles Azules
 Mexican Music: Juan Gabriel
 Regional Mexican Music: La Arrolladora Banda El Limón
 Ibero-American Music: Pablo Milanes, Óscar Chávez and Fernando Delgadillo
 Ballad: Sin Bandera
 Alternative Show: Les Luthiers
 Family Show: Cirque du Soleil
 Classical Show: London Philharmonic Orchestra directed by Alondra de la Parr
 Modern Dance: Blanca Li
 Musical Theater: The Lion King
 World Music: Los Pericos
 Festival: XLIII Festival Internacional Cervantino
 Ballet: Spanish National Dance Company
 Traditional Dance: Ballet Folkloric of the University of Colima
 Traditional Music: Susana Harp
 Emblematic Venue: Teatro Macedonio Alcalá
 Artistic Revelation: Felipe El Hombre

2017 
 Artistic Career: Enrique Guzman
 A Life on Stage: Ernesto Gomez Cruz
 Spanish Rock: Café Tacuba
 Spanish Rock / Precursors of the Contemporary Mexican Rock: Cecilia Toussaint
 Foreign Language Rock: Roger Waters
 Spanish Pop: Emmanuel & Mijares
 Foreign Language Pop: Ed Sheeran
 Electronic Music: Nortec Collective: Bostich + Fussible
 Jazz and Blues: Paco de Maria: Mexico Big Band Sounds
 Urban Music: Maluma
 Grupera Music: Julión Álvarez
 African-American Music: Los Ángeles Azules
 Mexican Music: Lila Downs
 Regional Mexican Music: Banda Sinaloense MS of Sergio Lizárraga
 Ibero-American Music: El Gusto es Nuestro: Joan Manuel Serrat, Miguel Ríos, Victor Manuel and Ana Belén
 Ballad: Carlos Rivera
 Alternative Show: Apocalyptica
 Family Show: Harry Potter and the Philosopher's Stone with the Orquesta Internacional de las Arte
 Classical Show: Ópera de Bellas Artes: Lucia di Lammermoor
 Modern Dance: First Contemporary Dance International Festival of Mexico City
 Musical Theater: El Hombre de la Mancha
 World Music: El Show de los 10 Pianos
 Festival: Corona Capital
 Ballet: Ballet of Jalisco: Don Quijote
 Traditional Dance: Guelaguetza
 Traditional Music: Diego el Cigala
 Precinct Landmark: Teatro Juárez
 Artistic Revelation: LNG / SHT

2018 
 Artistic Career: Horacio Franco
 International Career: Isaac Hernandez
 A Life on Stage: Patricia Reyes Spíndola
 Spanish Rock: Café Tacuba
 Foreign Language Rock: Depeche Mode
 Spanish Pop: Timbiriche
 Foreign Language Pop: Bruno Mars
 Electronic Music: Dimitri Vegas & Like Mike
 Jazz and Blues: Diana Krall
 Urban Music: J Balvin
 Grupera Music: Julión Álvarez
 African-American Music: Willie Colon: The King of Salsa
 Mexican Music: Aida Cuevas
 Regional Mexican Music: Banda Sinaloense MS of Sergio Lizárraga
 Ibero-American Music: Jorge Drexler
 Ballad: Carlos Rivera
 Alternative Entertainment: Cirque du Soleil
 Family Show: Disney On Ice: Follow your Emotions
 Classical Show: Vienna Philharmonic conducted by Gustavo Dudamel
 Modern Dance: 2ns Contemporary Dance International Festival of Mexico City
 Musical Theater: Billy Elliot the Musical
 World Music: La Santa Cecilia
 Festival: XLV Festival Internacional Cervantino
 Ballet: Ballet de Monterrey: The Phantom of the Opera, The Nutcracker and Swan Lake: Passion in Black and White
 Traditional Dance: Ballet Folklorico de Mexico of Amalia Hernandez
 Traditional Music: Omara Portuondo and Diego el Cigala: Omara & Diego
 Emblematic Venue: Teatro de la Ciudad Esperanza Iris
 Artistic Revelation: El David Aguilar

2019 
 Foreign Language Rock: Roger Waters
 Spanish Pop: Timbiriche
 Jazz and Blues: Big Band Jazz of México
 Regional Mexican Music: Los Tigres del Norte
 African-American Music: Los Ángeles Azules
 Mexican Music: Lila Downs
 Ibero-American Music: Cantautores presenta: Delgadillo, Filio y Oceransky
 Ballad: Carlos Rivera
 Alternative Show: Tokyo Ska Paradise Orchestra
 Family Show: Cirque du Soleil: Luzia
 Classical Show: Orquesta Filarmónica of UNAM
 Modern Dance: Compañía Nacional de Danza: Carmina Burana
 Ballet: Isaac Hernández: Despertares
 Traditional Dance: La Guelaguetza
 Traditional Music: Los Cojolites & Ampersand
 World Music: Los Pericos
 Festival: Vive Latino 2019
 Urban Music: Sebastián Yatra
 Musical Theater: Les Misérables
 Foreign Language Rock: Roger Waters
 Spanish Pop: Timbiriche
 Foreign Language Pop: Phil Collins
 Electronic Music: The Chemical Brothers
 Revelation: Ed Maverick
 A Life on Stage: Rafael Inclán
 Artistic Trajectory: Gloria Trevi
 Emblematic Venue: Teatro Ángela Peralta Mazatlán, Sinaloa

References

Mexican awards
Awards established in 2002